ECCC may refer to:

East Central Community College, a junior college in Decatur, Mississippi, USA
Eastern Collegiate Cycling Conference, a college-level bicycle-racing association in the eastern USA
Electronic Colloquium on Computational Complexity, an electronic archive of computer science papers
Electronic Commerce Council of Canada, the former name of GS1 Canada, a trade association 
Emerald City Comic Con, an annual comic book and pop culture convention held annually in Seattle, Washington, USA.
Environment and Climate Change Canada, a department of the Government of Canada
Essex County Cricket Club, a club for the sport of cricket in Essex, England
European Club Cup of Champions, a table tennis competition
European Champion Clubs Cup (athletics), an athletics competition
European Cybersecurity Competence Centre, an agency of the European Union
Evangelical Christian Church in Canada, the Canadian branch of Evangelical Christianity
Extraordinary Chambers in the Courts of Cambodia, better known as the Khmer Rouge Tribunal
Taiwan–Hong Kong Economic and Cultural Co-operation Council